The women's 100 metres at the 2014 European Athletics Championships took place at the Letzigrund on 12 and 13 August. Dutch runner Dafne Schippers won gold in 11.12 seconds.

Medalists

Records

Schedule

Results

Round 1

First 4 in each heat (Q) and 4 best performers (q) advance to the Semifinals.

Wind:Heat 1: −0.6 m/s, Heat 2: −0.4 m/s, Heat 3: +0.2 m/s, Heat 4: −0.4 m/s, Heat 5: +0.8 m/s

Semifinals
First 2 in each heat (Q) and 2 best performers (q) advance to the Final.

Wind:Heat 1: −1.9 m/s, Heat 2: +0.6 m/s, Heat 3: 0.0 m/s

Final

Wind: −1.7 m/s

References

100 W
100 metres at the European Athletics Championships
2014 in women's athletics